Gallowfauld is a hamlet in the county of Angus, Scotland.

References

Villages in Angus, Scotland